Sonya Alicia Curry (née Adams; born May 30, 1966) is an American educator. She is the mother of basketball players Stephen Curry and Seth Curry.

Early life 
Sonya Alicia Adams was born in Radford, Virginia, to Cleive and Candy Adams. They lived in extreme poverty and frequently had racist experiences with the Ku Klux Klan. In high school, Adams played volleyball, track and field, and basketball. She matriculated at Virginia Tech as a student athlete, where she played volleyball, earning all-conference honors in the Metro Conference as a junior. She received a degree in education. According to her best friend and college roommate, the volleyball team was popular largely due to Adams.

Adams met her future husband, Dell Curry, at Virginia Tech. During her official recruiting visit to the school, she was watching the men's basketball practice when Adams and Curry noticed each other.

Career 
Curry is president of the Christian Montessori School of Lake Norman in Huntersville, North Carolina, which she founded in 1995. Her children attended the school.

Personal life 
Curry's elder son, Stephen, plays for the Golden State Warriors and holds the all-time NBA record for three-pointers. He has won four NBA championships with the team. Her younger son, Seth, plays for the Brooklyn Nets. Her daughter, Sydel, played volleyball at Elon University. Curry has six grandchildren.

Starting when Stephen was in college playing with Davidson during the 2008 NCAA tournament, Curry began being a favorite shot for college basketball television producers. When Seth was playing college ball with Duke, her celebration of his three-point field goal against North Carolina in February 2013 had her trending on Twitter. She remained popular on the Internet during the Blue Devils' run in the 2013 NCAA tournament.

As she often receives camera time in the audience of Golden State games, Curry has been called NBA "royalty". She is often interviewed about how she successfully raised professional athletes, including two-time NBA Most Valuable Player Stephen. She shares how the family has been successful over time, including how they have dealt with their sons' success in the NBA.

Stephen and Seth Curry became the first brothers to ever compete against each other in an NBA Conference Finals in 2019, when Golden State played Portland. That postseason, Curry and Dell had been on the road since March, watching their sons' games from the stands. Stephen and Seth never played competitively against each other until they reached the NBA.

On August 23, 2021, Curry and her husband, Dell, announced that they were divorcing after 33 years of marriage.

References 

1966 births
Living people
20th-century African-American educators
20th-century African-American women
20th-century American educators
20th-century American women educators
21st-century African-American people
21st-century African-American women
21st-century American educators
21st-century American women educators
African-American Christians
American educators
American women's volleyball players
Curry family
Educators from North Carolina
Educators from Virginia
People from Charlotte, North Carolina
People from Radford, Virginia
Virginia Tech alumni